Anton Edler von Gapp (March 24, 1778 – April 1, 1862) was an Austrian lawyer, professor of law and in 1821 the Rector of the Olomouc Lyceum.

After finishing his law studies in 1806 von Gapp went to teach as a substitute at the (standard) Lyceum in Linz. He became professor at the lyceum in 1810. In 1816 he moved to Olomouc, where he became professor of Roman and canonical law at the (academic) Lyceum (now Palacký University of Olomouc). He was the director of the faculty of law between the years 1826–34, and in 1821 he was the rector of the Olomouc Lyceum. In years 1835–1848 he was teaching Roman law at the Faculty of Law of University of Vienna.

His son was Wesener Gapp.

Works

Sources 
Gerhard Köbler:Österreich

1778 births
1862 deaths
Austrian educators
Edlers of Austria
19th-century Austrian lawyers
Academic staff of Palacký University Olomouc
Rectors of the Palacký University Olomouc